Dennis A. Dougherty (born December 4, 1952 in Harrisburg, Pennsylvania) is the George Grant Hoag Professor of Chemistry at California Institute of Technology.  His research applies physical organic chemistry to systems of biological importance.  Dougherty utilizes a variety of approaches to further our understanding of the human brain, including the in vivo nonsense suppression methodology for incorporating unnatural amino acids into a variety of ion channels for structure-function studies.

Education
Dougherty received his B.S. and M.S. in 1974 from Bucknell University. Subsequently, he earned his Ph.D. in 1978 under the supervision of Kurt Mislow at Princeton University and was a post-doctoral scholar in Jerome Berson's lab at Yale University in 1979.

Career
In 1979 Dougherty became a member of the Caltech faculty, earning tenure in 1985.  He is the scientific co-founder of Neurion Pharmaceuticals, Inc. In 2005 he published a textbook entitled Modern Physical Organic Chemistry with co-author Eric V. Anslyn. 

Dougherty is the recipient of multiple teaching awards including the Richard Badger Teaching Award (1992), the ASCIT Excellence in Teaching Award (1987 and 2000), and the Richard P. Feynman Prize for Excellence in Teaching (2010).  In 2009, he was elected to the National Academy of Sciences.

Cation-π Interaction

Selected publications

Awards 

 Camille and Henry Dreyfus Teacher-Scholar (1984–1989) 
 AstraZeneca Excellence in Chemistry Award (1991) 
 Arthur C. Cope Scholar Award (1992) 
 Javits Neuroscience Investigator, NIH (2004) 
 ACS James Flack Norris Award in Physical Organic Chemistry (2008) 
 Richard P. Feynman Prize for Excellence in Teaching (2010) 
 Arthur C. Cope Award (2020)

Professional memberships 

 Phi Beta Kappa 
 American Chemical Society 
 American Association for the Advancement of Science 
 Biophysical Society 
 Society for Neuroscience
 National Academy of Sciences (2009)  
 Fellow of the American Association for the Advancement of Science (1994)
 Fellow of the American Academy of Arts and Sciences (1999)

Personal life 
He currently lives in South Pasadena with his wife Dr. Ellen Dougherty, the superintendent of the Lawndale Elementary School District.

References

External links
Neurion
Dougherty Lab Website
Dennis A. Dougherty lab page
Caltech Chemistry

21st-century American chemists
1952 births
People from Harrisburg, Pennsylvania
Living people
Members of the United States National Academy of Sciences